West End Pier was one of two piers in Morecambe, Lancashire, England, built during the late 19th century to an eventual length of  long and officially opened on 3 April 1896 by Colonel William Henry Foster MP. The pier was one of the first structures in the town to be installed with electric lighting in 1899.

The pier suffered storm damage in 1977 and with repair costs of £500,000, the pier was instead demolished the following year.

Layout
Shops would be located around the outside of a pavilion building that would have a capacity of 2,000 people.

History

Planning
Proposals for a West End Pier were made in 1878, when the West End Morecambe Pier Company proposed a  structure. Fourteen years later on 18 November 1892, a consortium of businessmen from Morecambe and Bradford formed the Morecambe (Regent Road) Pier Company with £20,000 in capital. Around the same time, a rival pier company, the Alexandra Road Pier and Pavilion Company, registered on 14 December 1892 with a £50,000 capital and planned to build a promenade pier with a pavilion, concert hall and shops, creating a situation where two rival companies were planning on building a new pier close to the other. In 1893, the Board of Trade intervened and stipulated that both applications would be dismissed unless a mutual agreement between the two companies could be made, on the grounds that each planned pier would intersect with the other. The two companies subsequently met on 8 February 1893 with provisional agreement that one company, the Alexandra Road Pier and Pavilion Company, should take 750 shares in return for withdrawing their application. As part of the agreement, the Regent Road company would pay £100 cash towards expenses incurred by their rival company, give them 500 shares and create a position for one of their directors. The Alexandra Road Pier and Pavilion Company was dissolved on 15 September 1896.

Construction

Construction for the pier was given Royal Assent on 29 June 1893 on the proviso that construction would commence within two years. Now named the West End Pier Company, work began in March 1895 with rapid progress reported by September 1895. For its construction, the pier required 1000 tons of iron, 26 tons of bolts and 3 tons of nails.

Opening
The pier was formally opened the following year on 3 April 1896 by Colonel William Henry Foster MP of Hornby Castle. The pavilion had not been completed by the time of the official opening, with work completed around Easter 1897 and following a successful summer, preparations to complete the remainder of the pier were made. The first 200 piles for the landing stage were driven in on 18 November 1897 with the last 198 piles driven in on 23 April 1898 for the pier head. The pier was one of the first structures in the town to be installed with electric lighting in 1899.

20th century
The pier sustained storm damage in 1903 and 1907, the latter washing away  of the extension and a fire in 1917 destroyed the pavilion.

Closure and demolition
A storm in November 1977 destroyed a third of the pier, isolating the open-air dancing area. With repair costs estimated at £500,000, it was considered too prohibitive and demolition occurred in 1978. No pier was built to replace it.

See also
 Central Pier, Morecambe

References
Citations

Sources

Further reading
 
 

Piers in Lancashire
Buildings and structures in Morecambe
Buildings and structures demolished in 1978